City Hall, originally known as Boy's High School, is a historic city hall located Reading, Berks County, Pennsylvania.  It was built in 1904, as the high school for boys, and converted to use as a city hall in 1929.  It is a three-story, with basement, granite and gray brick building in the Beaux Arts style.  It features terra cotta decorative elements and measures 210 feet by 201 feet.

It was listed on the National Register of Historic Places in 1982.

References

Buildings and structures in Reading, Pennsylvania
City and town halls on the National Register of Historic Places in Pennsylvania
Beaux-Arts architecture in Pennsylvania
School buildings completed in 1904
National Register of Historic Places in Reading, Pennsylvania
City and town halls in Pennsylvania